Alexander Chaffers was a notorious lawyer who was a party in the scandal of Sir Travers and Lady Twiss in 1872 and was subsequently considered such a vexatious litigant that the Vexatious Actions Act was passed in 1896 to stop him.  He died in a workhouse.

References

English solicitors
1821 births
1899 deaths
Vexatious litigants
19th-century English lawyers